Axé Bahia is a six-member Eurodance/axé music group from Brazil, who achieved fame in South America with their single "Beijo na Boca", particularly the Spanish-language version, "Beso en la Boca".

Axé Bahia began its quest for fame in the late 1990s. Based in Brazil, the group was originally made up of Flaviana Seeling, Jeferson Fabiano Barbosa (died 2016), Jociney Barbosa, Thalyta, Amanda, and Rodrigo. The group, headed by Flaviana Seeling, was discovered by a Chilean businessman who saw some of its members dancing at a resort.

The group headed to Chile to test their luck and take their shot at fame in 2001. Shortly after arriving to Chile, three of the group's members, Thalyta, Amanda, and Rodrigo, decided to head back to Brazil. The group in Chile decided to search for two more members and found Francini Contin do Amaral and Bruno Alexandre Lazzaretti. Flaviana Seeling, Jeferson Fabiano Barbosa, Jociney Barbosa, Francini Contin do Amaral, and Bruno Alexandre Lazzaretti are the five members that have performed the majority of the group's songs and dances, and is the group best known as Axé Bahia. When Flaviana Seeling got pregnant in 2003, the group added a sixth member, Brenda Carvalho, who replaced Seeling during her pregnancy. Afterward, Brenda Carvalho started her own group, Exporto Brasil. Axé Bahia, throughout its ongoing change in membership, has worked in Brazil, Chile, El Salvador (Canal 6), Mexico City and Peru, to name a few places. The group had to learn Spanish to be able to record outside of Brazil. This paid off, and they sold thousands of copies of their two albums throughout Latin America.

The membership of Axé Bahia, changed again in 2006, moving back to a sextet. The current members are Flaviana Seeling, Jeferson Fabiano Barbosa, Jociney Barbosa, and new members, Cleverson Leandro Ribeiro, Meire Guimaraes de Carvalho, and Gisele Salardi. In 2006, Axé Bahia, along with adding three new members, created Axé Bahia Company, a dance school. Axé Bahia is most famous for its songs "Beijo Na Boca" (Spanish: "Beso en la Boca"), and "Tudo Bem".

"H Bahía" is a spin-off group from Axé Bahía.

On April 22, 2016, cofounder Jeferson Fabiano Barbosa died at age 40 after falling from the 20th floor from a departament in Santiago de Chile.

Discography 
2002: Tudo bem
 "Namorar Pelado (Beijo Na Boca)" - 3:29
 "Tesouro Do Pirata (Onda Onda)" - 2:46
 "Dança Da Manivela" - 4:00
 "Tudo Bem” - 3:41
“ Maomeno
 "Tekila “
 " Tapinha
“"Tchu Tchuca"
“Sempre Quer Me Bater “
“Gingado De Mola (Mostra)”
“Amo Voce"
“Beso en La Boca “ (Namorar Pelado Namorar PeladoVersion En Español)
2002: Tudo bem 2, o ritmo continua
 "Danca Do Esquisito"
 "Pitbul"
 "Maomeno"
 "Amo Voce"
 “Tapinha”
“Flaviana”
 "Danca Do Vampiro"
 "Molinho Molinho “
 "Raimunda"
 "Que Calor, Que Calor “
 "Essa E Nova Moda"
 "A Moda Do Oriente"
 "Pra Ficar Dez"
 "Sempre Quer Me Bater"
2003: Vuelve la onda del verano
 "Namorar Pelado"
 "Danca Da Manivela"
 "Vuelve La Onda"
 "Tesouro Do Pirata"
 "La Batidora"
 "Tudo Bem"
 "Ali Baba"
 "Maomeno"
 "Que Calor Que Calor"
 "Tchu Tchuca"
 "Danca Do Toureiro"
 "Banho de Yemanja"
 "Nego Maluco"
 "Beso en La Boca"
2005: Positivo
 "Aerosamba" - 0:44
 "Es O No Es (Da ou Desce)" - 3:40
 "No Estoy Ni Ahi (To Nem Ai)" - 3:28
 "Pusha Pusha" - 3:39
 "La Cucarachiña (Dona Baratinha)" - 3:51
 "Mama Yo Quiero (Mamae Eu Quero)" - 3:09
 "Peloton (Pelotao Da Xuxa)" - 4:08
 "Sacudiendo a Yaca" - 3:36
 "Filete" - 3:21
 "Mueve La Pompa" - 4:00
 "Clima de Rodeo (Clima de Rodeio)" - 3:58
 "El Baile de Las Manitas (Danca Da Maozinha)" - 3:33
 "No Estoy Ni Ahi (To Nem Ai)" - 4:38
2008 Melhores Sucessos
 Danca Do Esquisito
 Yo Quiero Bailar
 Vuelve La Onda
 Tesouro Do Pirata (Remix)
 Tekila 
 Tudo Bem (Remix)
 Tudo Bem 
 Molinho Molinho 
 Raimunda
 Beso En La Boca 
 Essa E A Nova Moda 
 Tapinha 
 Onda Onda
 Namora Pelado 
 Namora Pelado (Remix)
 Positivo Drink 
 Danca Da Manivela (Remix)
 Gingado De Mola
 Pitbull
 La Cucarachiña
2014 Fiesta Mundial Ecuador 2014
 Dimelo
 Mueve La Pompa
 Jugaste Con Mi Amor
 Llondando un Cariño
 Homenaje 
 No Es Fácil Perdonar
 El Cabanal
 Danca Do Tchan (En Vivo)
 La Terecumbia
 Que Ciego Fui
 Bailando Cuarare
 Así No Mamasita
 Donde Está El Amor
 Fresh Open Bar (En Vivo)
 Bla Bla Bla (En Vivo)
2016 Dance History 2.0
 Around The World
  Captain Jack
  Kernkraft  400
 Beso En La Boca (Remix)
 Something Goin On
 Will I (Extendex Mix)
 Push The Feeling On
 Professional Widow
 Everytime You Need Me ( Featuring Maria Rubia)
 Fly On The Wings Of Love 2011

References

External links
 Official website

Brazilian musical groups
Spanish-language singers of Brazil